Alan Mak (born 19 November 1983) is a British Conservative Party politician who served as Exchequer Secretary to the Treasury from July to September 2022. He was elected as the Member of Parliament (MP) for Havant in Hampshire in 2015.

Early life
Mak was born in York to Chinese parents who were born in Guangdong and who settled in Hong Kong before moving to England, where they owned a Chinese food take-away. He attended Queen Anne Comprehensive School, York until the age of 13, before gaining an assisted place to attend St Peter's School, York. He read Law at Peterhouse, Cambridge, winning the ECS Wade Prize for Administrative Law, before completing a post-graduate law & business diploma in Oxford, where he was a runner-up for the Oxford Leadership Prize. He subsequently practised as a solicitor with Clifford Chance.

Mak was named Graduate of the Year by Realworld in 2005. In 2010, he was recognised with the award for Young City Lawyer of the year in Square Mile magazine's 30 under 30 awards in 2010.

For over five years, Mak served as Trustee and later President of the child hunger and poverty charity Magic Breakfast. While serving as a Trustee, Magic Breakfast was awarded a Big Society Award in 2011 by Prime Minister David Cameron. In recognition of his work with the charity, he was selected to carry the Olympic Torch on 20 June, 2012, in the town of Bedale as part of the 2012 Summer Olympics torch relay.

Parliamentary career

2015 general election
Mak was elected as Member of Parliament for Havant at the 2015 general election. He is the first East Asian to be elected to the House of Commons. However, he is uncomfortable with being defined solely by his ethnic identity and has dismissed the notion that his election as MP would raise the profile of British East Asians. In an interview with the South China Morning Posts Post Magazine, he said "If the CFC and Chinese for Labour think I am going to be representing every Chinese, Thai, Vietnamese and Korean—and there are many in my constituency—they are mistaken. It's a stupid story. I am not standing for the Chinese population of Britain. I am standing for the people of Havant and my country". Following his election he expressed concern about the attention his ethnicity, and subsequent political breakthrough, was receiving from both international media and British Chinese groups.

Backbencher
One month after the 2015 general election, Mak was selected to participate in the Armed Forces Parliamentary Scheme in the Royal Navy.

In June 2015, Patrick Kidd wrote in The Times that Mak had gained a reputation for "self-promotion" amongst his parliamentary colleagues and "is getting up people’s noses." It was also reported in The Spectator that Mak was prevented by Conservative MPs from sitting in his "favourite spot" behind David Cameron at Prime Minister's Questions, which Mak had hoped would enable "a brief TV appearance." When Mak was appointed a government whip in 2021, Letts tweeted: "Years of assiduous loyalty are finally rewarded. A great day for greasers". Mak's loyalty was also noted by Stephen Bush, who described him as "a long-term specialist in parliamentary questions of the 'does the minister agree with me that the government is a friend to fluffy kittens and socially responsible businesses?' variety".

Mak announced in February 2016 that he would campaign to remain in the EU in the June 2016 EU membership referendum. This decision was criticised by local party members as a political "U-turn" and received speculation in The Huffington Post as being affected by "careerism."

Every year since 2016, Mak has run two annual constituency fairs, the Community Information Fair and the Jobs, Apprenticeships, and Careers Fair. The same year he also started the Small Business Awards for recognising the best local businesses in the constituency. In 2022, he began another annual constituency fair, the Community Health and Wellbeing Fair.

Mak won the 2017 Newcomer Conservative MP of the Year Award in the annual cross-party MP of the Year Awards, hosted by the Speaker of the House of Commons, for organising several community events. He later won the 2021 Conservative MP of the Year Award for creating the Havant Constituency COVID-19 Local Volunteer Network.

In June 2017, following the result of the 2017 general election, Mak was mocked by BBC presenter Simon McCoy due to his repetition of soundbites defending Theresa May. McCoy asked: "Is this a speech you have all been given to read out?" in response to Mak stating: "Our job is to make sure we form a strong and stable government" and to "provide certainty". This was in contrast to popular opinion inside Westminster and among the public, that the result had caused instability within the Conservative Party and the government. McCoy responded by saying “Alan forgive me, I don’t know where you have been for the last few days".

In 2016, Mak founded and chaired the All-Party Parliamentary Group (APPG) on the Fourth Industrial Revolution and has worked on future technology in Parliament. In 2018, Mak authored with the Centre for Policy Studies a report on modernising the NHS on its 70th birthday which included a list of ten policy proposals. Mak introduced two Private Members Bills focused on modernising the NHS. The first calling for the banning of fax machines and pagers and the second proposing the NHS Reserves System Bill, which would create a volunteer reservist system in the NHS similar to the military reserve systems. Mak was selected to represent the United Kingdom APPG on the Fourth Industrial Revolution to the 2019 Munich Young Leaders conference, part of the Munich Security Conference.

Mak has served on the executive committee of the British-American Parliamentary Group and visited the United States in 2015 as part of the US Department of State’s International Visitor Leadership Program.

In 2020, Mak co-founded the Blossom Awards to “celebrate the success and contribution of the British-Chinese Community to the national life of the United Kingdom.”

In Government
On 21 April 2021, Mak was appointed a Lord Commissioner of the Treasury (Government Whip). He was the designated whip for the Ministry of Defence Ministers.  The appointment made Mak the first British government minister of ethnic Chinese origin. 

On 8 July 2022, he was appointed Exchequer Secretary to the Treasury as part of outgoing Prime Minister Boris Johnson’s caretaker administration. Mak left the position on 7 September 2022, when Felicity Buchan was named as his successor in the newly formed Truss ministry. Highlights of Mak's tenure as Exchequer Secretary included responding for the government in a House of Commons debate on Small Brewers’ Relief and the wider HM Treasury review of alcohol duty and taxation, as well as visiting the Treasury's Darlington Economic Campus.

References

External links
 
 

1983 births
Living people
Alumni of Peterhouse, Cambridge
Conservative Party (UK) MPs for English constituencies
English people of Chinese descent
English solicitors
People educated at St Peter's School, York
Politicians from York
British politicians of Chinese descent
UK MPs 2015–2017
UK MPs 2017–2019
UK MPs 2019–present